OncoTargets and Therapy is a peer-reviewed medical journal covering research on all aspects of oncology. The journal was established in 2008 and is published by Dove Medical Press. Its current editor-in-chief is Dr. Gaetano Romano (Temple University).

Currently, the journal is abstracted and indexed in PubMed, Scopus, and others.

The journal has a 2021 impact factor of 4.345.

References

External links 
 

English-language journals
Oncology journals
Dove Medical Press academic journals
Open access journals
Publications established in 2008